Bill Johnson (born July 18, 1951) is an American Christian minister and evangelist. He is the senior leader of Bethel Church, a charismatic megachurch in Redding, California. The church has grown in membership from 2,000 when he joined in 1996, to over 11,000 in 2019. Johnson has taken public conservative positions on same-sex marriage, abortion, open borders, and many other topics. He is an author, functions as an itinerant speaker and has been featured in various media.

Biography 

Johnson is a fifth-generation pastor and has held the position of senior leader at Bethel Church since 1996. He is known for leading a church and Christian movement with a large focus on miracles and the Holy Spirit. According to Christianity Today, Johnson has "considerable influence among charismatic Christians all over the world". Johnson joined Bethel with a stipulation that the message would always be about revival, with an emphasis on God's supernatural presence. The church lost a thousand members over his vision. However, under his leadership, the church has since grown from 2,000 members in 1996 to over 11,000 in 2019. His father, M. Earl Johnson, previously held the Senior Pastor position from 1968 to 1982, when Bethel Church was part of the Assemblies of God. Prior to this position, Johnson, along with his wife, served as the Senior Pastors of Mountain Chapel in Weaverville, California from 1978 to 1996.

Johnson attended a John Wimber signs and wonders conference in 1987 with the specific goal of seeking a revival of healing. He left discouraged because he had been teaching the same concepts John Wimber had been teaching, but the outcome was drastically different. Johnson states that this discouragement brought about a realization that faith required risk, and after this realization, the healing miracles began to happen. He traveled to Toronto, Canada in 1995 to attend some of the Toronto Blessing revival meetings. Johnson recounts receiving a fresh touch from God at these meetings that focused his life's work on pursuing the Holy Spirit and the gifts of the Spirit.

In 1998, Johnson, along with Bethel Senior Associate Leader Kris Vallotton, started the Bethel School of Supernatural Ministry to train students to become revivalists. The school has over 2,000 students from 57 countries. Johnson is also part of the Core Residential Faculty at Wagner University in Rancho Cucamonga, CA.

Brenda ("Beni"), the wife of Bill Johnson, passed away from cancer on 13 July, 2022.

Bill and Brenda Johnson have three children including: Brian Johnson, Eric Johnson and Leah Valenzuela.

Popular culture 

Johnson has appeared in multiple documentaries, including Father of Lights and Holy Ghost Reborn, produced by Darren Wilson. He has also been interviewed and highlighted in several CBN news stories. He was featured on the cover of Charisma magazine in August 2016 with a story titled "Born for Revival." Johnson was also a guest on Sid Roth's It's Supernatural in October 2016. Johnson was featured in the 2018 documentary American Gospel: Christ Alone as a prominent figure in the prosperity gospel movement, emphasizing supernatural miracles as evidence of salvation. Johnson has also been the subject of criticism.

Political and cultural views 

In 2016, Bill Johnson outlined why he voted for Donald Trump in a Facebook post, where he criticized abortion, open borders, the welfare system, same-sex marriage, socialism, political correctness and globalization, all as contrary to God's will. His wife and senior pastor, Beni Johnson, has also supported Donald Trump. Johnson again endorsed Trump in 2020.

Bill Johnson opposes homosexuality calling it a sin and "violation of design". In a Facebook video blog he elaborated on the issue stating that "God did not make those human bodies to come together, to fit, in that way".

In 2018, his church publicly opposed three bills in the California state legislature that would have restricted conversion therapy as they felt the bills might have restricted their ministry. Their opposition included a released statement, letters to legislators and encouragement of congregants to contact legislators through a sermon titled "What Would Jesus Do in a PC World?" by senior associate leader of the church Kris Vallotton and tweets, also by Vallotton, that specifically addressed those that had "come out of homosexuality".

Published works 

 When Heaven Invades Earth (Destiny Image Publishers, 2003) 
 The Supernatural Power of a Transformed Mind (Destiny Image Publishers, 2005) 
 When Heaven Invades Earth Devotional & Journal (Destiny Image Publishers, August 2005) 
 Shifting Shadow of Supernatural Power: A Prophetic Manual for Those Wanting to Move in God's Supernatural Power (co-author) (Destiny Image Publishers, August 2006) 
 Dreaming With God (Destiny Image, December 2006) 
 The Supernatural Ways of Royalty (co-author) (Destiny Image Publishers, 2006) 
 The Supernatural Ways of Royalty Leader's Guide (co-author) (Destiny Image Publishers, 2006) 
 The Supernatural Power of a Transformed Mind 40-Day Devotional and Personal Journal (Destiny Image, September 2006)  
 Here Comes Heaven!: A Kid's Guide to God's Supernatural Power (co-author) (Destiny Image, October 2007) 
 Face to Face with God (Charisma House, 2007) 
 Strengthen Yourself in The Lord (Destiny Image Publishers, 2007) 
 A Life of Miracles: A 365-day guide to prayer and miracles (Destiny Image, February 2008) 
 Strengthen Yourself in the Lord (Audio Book) (Destiny Image, February 2008) 
 Release the Power of Jesus (Destiny Imae Publishers, 2009) 
 The Essential Guide to Healing (co-author) (Chosen Books, 2011) 
 Walking in the Supernatural: Another Cup of Spiritual Java (Destiny Image Publishers, 2012) 
 Hosting the Presence (Destiny Image Publishers, 2012) 
 Hosting the Presence Every Day: 365 Days to Unveiling Heaven's Agenda for Your Life (Destiny Image Publishers, 2014) 
 Hosting the Presence Workbook: Unveiling Heaven's Agenda (Destiny Image Publishers, 2013) 
 Discovering Your Purpose: A Short Interview with Bill Johnson (Bill Johnson Ministries, 2014) 
 Spiritual Java (Destiny Image Publishers, 2016) 
 Healing Unplugged: Conversations and Insights from Two Veteran Healing Leaders (Destiny Image Publishers, 2016) 
 Releasing the Spirit of Prophecy: The Supernatural Power of Testimony (Destiny Image Publishers, 2014) 
 Experience the Impossible (Chosen Books, 2014) 
 The Supernatural Power of a Transformed Mind Study Guide: Access to a Life of Miracles (Chosen Books, 2014) 
 Strengthen Yourself in The Lord Leader's Guide (Destiny Image Publishers, 2015) 
 Strengthen Yourself in The Lord Study Guide (Destiny Image Publishers, 2015) 
 Power That Changes the World: Creating Eternal Impact in the Here and Now (Destiny Image Publishers, 2015) 
 Defining Moments (Whitaker House, 2016) 
 God is Good (Destiny Image Publishers, 2016) 
 God is Good Interactive Manual: He's Better Than You Think (Destiny Image Publishers, 2016) 
 A Daily Invitation to Friendship With God: Dreaming with God to Transform Your World (Destiny Image Publishers, 2016) 
 Jesus Christ is Perfect Theology (Destiny Image Publishers, 2016) 
 Encountering the Goodness of God: 90 Daily Devotions (Destiny Image Publishers, 2017) 
 God is Really Good (Destiny Image Publishers, 2017) 
 When Heaven Invades Earth for Teens: Your Guide to God's Supernatural Power (Destiny Image Publishers, 2017) 
 Is God Really Good?: Bill Johnson Answers Your Toughest Questions about the Goodness of God (Destiny Image Publishers, 2017) 
 The Way of Life (Destiny Image Publishers, 2018) 
 The Resting Place: Living Immersed in the Presence of God (Destiny Image Publishers, 2019) 
 Meeting God Face to Face: Daily Encouragement to Seek His Presence and Favor (Charisma House, 2019) 
 The Way of Life Leader's Guide: Experiencing the Culture of Heaven on Earth (Destiny Image, 2019) 
 Born for Significance: Master the Purpose, Process, and Peril of Promotion (Charisma House, 2020) 
 Raising Giant-Killers: Releasing Your Child's Divine Destiny through Intentional Parenting (Destiny Image Publishers, 2020) 
 Raising Giant-Killers Leaders Guide: Releasing Your Child's Divine Destiny through Intentional Parenting (Destiny Image Publishers, 2020) 
 Raising Giant-Killers Participant's Guide: Releasing Your Child's Divine Destiny through Intentional Parenting (Destiny Image Publishers, 2020) 
 The Mind of God: How His Wisdom Can Transform Our World (Destiny Image Publishers, 2020) 
 How to Respond to Disaster: By Living Anchored in the Goodness of God (Destiny Image Publishers, 2020) 
 HOPE in Any Crisis: Stop Fear and Release God's Goodness In Uncertain Times (Destiny Image Publishers, 2020) 
 The King's Way of Life (Destiny Image Publishers, 2020) 
 Mornings and Evenings in His Presence: A Lifestyle of Daily Encounters with God (Destiny Image Publishers, 2020) 
 Rejoice Into Joy: Three Keys to Experiencing the Fullness of Heaven's Joy (Destiny Image Publishers, 2021) 
 Your Journey to Significance: A Daily Discovery of Who God Created You to Be (Charisma House, 2021) 
 Open Heavens: Position Yourself to Encounter the God of Revival (Destiny Image Publishers, 2021) 
 Peace in Every Storm: 52 Declarations & Meditations for Difficult Times (BroadStreet Publishing Group LLC, 2021) 
 Bible Promises and Prayers for Children: Releasing Your Child's Divine Destiny (Destiny Image Publishers, 2021) 
 Born for Significance Study Guide (Charisma House, 2021)

References 

1951 births
Living people
20th-century Protestants
21st-century American male writers
21st-century American non-fiction writers
21st-century Protestants
American Charismatics
American Christian religious leaders
American Christian writers
American evangelists
American male non-fiction writers
Christian revivalists
Christians from California
Conservatism in the United States
People from Redding, California
Writers from California